Yudel Johnson Cedeno (born 6 June 1981) is a Cuban welterweight professional boxer, who is best known for winning an Olympic Light-Welterweight silver 2004 as an amateur.
Some sources write the family name Jhonson.

Amateur career
Southpaw Johnson won the gold medal in the men's featherweight division at the 1999 PanAm Games. He moved up afterwards but skipped lightweight as the dominant Mario Kindelán was Cuban champ.

Johnson added a silver at the 2004 Summer Olympics in the Light-Welterweight Boxing division Dilshod Mahmudov and Boris Georgiev but losing to Manus Boonjumnong in the final. He qualified for the Olympic Games by ending up in first place at the 2nd AIBA American 2004 Olympic Qualifying Tournament in Rio de Janeiro, Brazil. Prior to the Athens Games he won the 2004 Acropolis Boxing Cup in Athens, Greece by defeating Turkey's Mustafa Karagollu in the final of the light welterweight division.

Johnson also won at the 2006 Central American Games but had strong domestic competition in Inocente Fiss. In 2008 he fought at welter losing to Carlos Banteaux in the final of the national championships.

Olympic results
Received a bye in the 1st round
Defeated Davis Mwale (Zambia) RSC-3 (1:49)
Defeated Dilshod Mahmudov (Uzbekistan) 32–18
Defeated Boris Georgiev (Bulgaria) 13–9
Lost to Manus Boonjumnong (Thailand) 11–17

Professional career
Johnson defected along with Guillermo Rigondeaux and Yordanis Despaigne to the United States and made his pro debut on May 22, 2009, in Miami. As of September 2011 he is undefeated with 11 wins, 7 of which were by way of knockout.

Professional boxing record

| style="text-align:center;" colspan="8"|12 Wins (8 Knockouts), 0 Defeats, 0 Draws
|-  style="text-align:center; background:#e3e3e3;"
|  style="border-style:none none solid solid; "|Res.
|  style="border-style:none none solid solid; "|Record
|  style="border-style:none none solid solid; "|Opponent
|  style="border-style:none none solid solid; "|Type
|  style="border-style:none none solid solid; "|Rd., Time
|  style="border-style:none none solid solid; "|Date
|  style="border-style:none none solid solid; "|Location
|  style="border-style:none none solid solid; "|Notes
|- align=center
|Win
|16–1
|align=left| Norberto Gonzalez
|
|
|
|align=left|
|align=left|
|- align=center
|- align=center
|Win
|15–1
|align=left| Lenwood Dozier
|
|
|
|align=left|
|align=left|
|- align=center
|- align=center
|Win
|14–1
|align=left| Humberto Toledo
|
|
|
|align=left|
|align=left|
|- align=center
|- align=center
|Win
|13–1
|align=left| Dashon Johnson
|
|
|
|align=left|
|align=left|
|- align=center
|- align=center
|Lose
|12–1
|align=left| Willie Nelson
|
|
|
|align=left|
|align=left|
|- align=center
|- align=center
|Win
|12–0
|align=left| Eduardo Mercedes
|
|
|
|align=left|
|align=left|
|- align=center
|- align=center
|Win
|11–0
|align=left| Jose Miguel Torres
|
|
|
|align=left|
|align=left|
|- align=center
|Win
|10–0
|align=left| Richard Gutierrez
|
|
|
|align=left|
|align=left|
|- align=center
|Win
|9–0
|align=left| Joseph De los Santos	
|
|
|
|align=left|
|align=left|
|- align=center
|Win
|8–0
|align=left| Steve Verdin
|
|
|
|align=left|
|align=left|
|- align=center
|Win
|7–0
|align=left| Juliano Ramos
|
|
|
|align=left|
|align=left|
|- align=center
|Win
|6–0
|align=left| Chris Grays
|
|
|
|align=left|
|align=left|
|- align=center
|Win
|5–0
|align=left| Dorian Beaupierre
|
|
|
|align=left|
|align=left|
|- align=center
|Win
|4–0
|align=left| Louie Leija
|
|
|
|align=left|
|align=left|
|- align=center
|Win
|3–0
|align=left| Frankie Santos
|
|
|
|align=left|
|align=left|
|- align=center
|Win
|2–0
|align=left| Justin Paulo
|
|
|
|align=left|
|align=left|
|- align=center
|Win
|1–0
|align=left| Greg Weathers
|
|
|
|align=left|
|align=left|

References

External links
 
PanAm Games 1999
Central Americans 2006

1981 births
Living people
Olympic boxers of Cuba
Olympic silver medalists for Cuba
Boxers at the 1999 Pan American Games
Boxers at the 2004 Summer Olympics
Olympic medalists in boxing
Medalists at the 2004 Summer Olympics
Cuban male boxers
Pan American Games gold medalists for Cuba
Pan American Games medalists in boxing
Central American and Caribbean Games gold medalists for Cuba
Competitors at the 2006 Central American and Caribbean Games
Featherweight boxers
Central American and Caribbean Games medalists in boxing
Medalists at the 1999 Pan American Games
21st-century Cuban people